The Church of God (Full Gospel) in India is the registered name of the branch in India of the Church of God (Cleveland, Tennessee, USA), a Pentecostal church that has over 36,000 churches and 7 million members in 178 countries. The Church of God in India currently has thousands of churches and ministers spread across the various states of India and is organised into different regions.

Beginnings 
The work of the Church of God was started in India by the American missionary Robert F. Cook. Cook worked in India from the 1920s through the 1940s. After some attempts to begin a Pentecostal work in northern parts of India, Cook realized that there were ancient Christian communities in southern India, especially in Kerala. After arriving in Kerala, he fell in love with the land and the people. He crossed paths with a man named Kalloor Chacko, of Thrikkannamangal, Kottarakara. While a prominent figure in the Brethren Church in India, Chacko accepted the teachings of Cook regarding the work of the Holy Spirit. The two joined hands to establish the first registered Pentecostal church in India. It was named the Church of God. The two built the first church building on land set aside by Chacko.

A number of early leaders, including Rev. K. E. Abraham, worked hand in hand with Cook to establish numerous works in various parts of Kerala. As time went by, disagreements over doctrine and organizational structure led to many of these early leaders parting ways. Disagreement with Chacko also resulted in Cook relocating the headquarters to Mulakuzha. Cook and his fellow believers realised the need to be affiliated to a well-established denomination. They decided to join the Church of God (Cleveland, Tennessee). The founder of the Ceylon Pentecostal Mission Rev. Ramankutty, later known as Pastor Paul, also worked with Cook for some time before starting off on his own path.

Early leaders that worked with Cook in building up the Church of God in its early days in Mulakuzha include Rev. T.M. Varghese and Rev. U. Thomas. When laws were passed that forbade foreign missionaries in India, it was T.M. Varghese that served as the Field Secretary. When the Church had developed to the point that it was granted its own leadership, Rev. U. Thomas served as the first Overseer.

Current organisation 
The Church was divided into three districts. These included Kerala State, Tamil Nadu and Central Region. Kerala State was later divided into two at the request of the brothers of low caste backgrounds. The new region was named Kerala Division and is now named kerala region, with headquarters in Kottayam. The region of Andhra Pradesh was included. The work that was started and run by Rev. Samuel John was incorporated into the Church as the Northern Region. In the 1990s, under the leadership of Rev. KM Thankachan, the Central Region was divided into two regions with Mumbai as the headquarters of the Western Region and Kolkata as the headquarters of the Eastern Region.

Regions

Kerala State 
Headquartered in Mulakuzha, Kerala.

State Overseers 
Kerala State had its first State Representative in 1964. Thereafter the church has had ten State Representatives/Overseers:
Rev. U. Thomas (1964–1966)
Rev. P. C. Chacko (1966–1970)
Rev. A. V. Abraham (1971–1978)
Rev. M. V. Chacko (1978–1988)
Rev. P. A. V. Sam (1988–2000)
Rev. V. C. Itty (2000–2002)
Rev. K. C. John (2002–2008)
Rev. M. Kunjappy (2008–2012)
Rev P. J. James (2012–2016)
Rev C. C. Thomas (2016–present)

Thiruvalla Convention 
The Church of God (Full Gospel) in India, Kerala State, holds a week-long convention in the month of January every year at the Thiruvalla convention grounds. The Church is due to celebrate its centenary in January 2023. As of 2021, the Church held its 98th General Convention from the 11th to the 13th of March 2021. Due to the COVID 19 pandemic, it was held at Mount Zion, Mulakuzha (Headquarters) instead of at the normal venue of the convention grounds in Thiruvalla, with restricted numbers in attendance.

Tamil Nadu 
Headquartered in Chennai, Tamil Nadu

Kerala Region 
Headquartered in Pakkil, Kottayam

The first Pentecostal movement in Kerala

The Church of God Kerala Region has previously been known by names including?

1921 Full Gospel in India
1935 Church of God Full Gospel in 
India
1972 Church of God Full Gospel in 
Kerala Division
2004  Church of God Full Gospel in Kerala Region

KERALA REGION LEADERS
Rev. Robert F. Cook (1921-1949)
Rev. T. M. Varghese (1935 to 1964)
Rev. U. Thomas (1964–1966)
Rev. P. C. Chacko (1966–1970)
Rev. A. V. Abraham (1971–72)
Rev. K. J. Chacko (1972–1984)
Rev. Y. Joseph(1984–1990)
Rev. Sunny Varky (1990–2002)
Rev. P. J. Joseph (2002–2008)
Rev. Thomas Jhone (2008–2009)
Rev. K. C. John (2009–2012)
Rev. Joseph T Sam (2012–2016)
Rev. K. C. Sunnykutty (2016–2020)
Rev. N. P. Kochumon (2020–Present)

Central Western Region 
Headquartered in Mumbai, Maharashtra. Rev. Benison Mathai is the current overseer of the Central Western Region.

Central Eastern Region 
Headquartered in Kolkata, West Bengal. Rev. Benny John is the current regional overseer for the Central Eastern Region.

Northern Region 
Headquartered in Chandigarh, Haryana

See also 
 Church of God (Cleveland, Tennessee)
 Pentecostalism

Pentecostal denominations in Asia